Anti Indian is a 2021 Indian Tamil-language political satire film written and directed by C. Elamaran and produced by Aadham Bava. The film stars  himself, Radha Ravi, Aadukalam Naren, 'Vazhakku En' Muthuraman, Velu Prabhakaran, Ghilli Maran, and Suresh Chakravarthy. The film was released on 10 December 2021.

Plot 
Baasha, a film critic, dies just few days before the assembly by-election for Mylapore constituency while the election campaign by the political parties are in full swing. Various obstacles faced to bury the deceased are revealed.

Cast 
 Blue Sattai Maran as Basha
Aadukalam Naren as Deputy Commissioner
Radha Ravi as Mr. Senguttuvan, Chief Minister
Vazhakku En Muthuraman as Inspector
Suresh Chakravarthi as Tahsildar
Jayaraj as Ezhumalai
Karna Raja as Raja, Politician
KPY Bala as Shamiana Boy 
Pasi Sathya as Saroja's Friend 
 Sneba as Church Father
Ghilli Maran as Black Shirt Guy
Durai Sudhakar as Ruling Party Candidate
Velu Prabhakaran as Hajiyar
Lollu Sabha Seshu as Baasha's Uncle

See also
Anti-Indian sentiment

Certification 
The Central Board of Film Certification has refused to certify this film. Blue Shirt Maran submitted his film to the Revising Committee in Bengaluru for review on 5 April 2021 and their decision was conveyed to him on the same day.
The makers of the film are said to have been asked by the Revising Committee of the Censor Board to make 38 changes. After Udta Punjab and Padmavat, Anti Indian is said to be the film to have faced these many cuts from the revising committee. The film makers filed a case in the court, which after hearing the arguments, the court dismissed the recommendations of the earlier teams of the Censor Board and directed to constitute a fresh committee and asked them to issue an appropriate certificate with proper cuts. Following this, a fresh committee watched the film and cleared it with a U/A certificate, suggesting only three small corrections.

References

External links 
 

2021 films
2020s Tamil-language films